The 2011 NCAA Division III baseball tournament was played at the end of the 2011 NCAA Division III baseball season to determine the 36th national champion of college baseball at the NCAA Division III level. The tournament concluded with eight teams competing at Time Warner Cable Field at Fox Cities Stadium in Grand Chute, Wisconsin for the championship. Eight regional tournaments were held to determine the participants in the World Series. Regional tournaments were contested in double-elimination format, with four regions consisting of six teams, one consisting of seven, and three consisting of eight, for a total of 55 teams participating in the tournament.

Bids
The 55 competing teams were:

Regionals
Bold indicates winner.

West Regional
Walt Driggers Field-Abilene, TX (Host: McMurry University)

Mid-Atlantic Regional
FirstEnergy Park-Lakewood, NJ (Host: Kean University)

Mideast Regional
Don Schaly Stadium-Marietta, OH (Host: Marietta College)

South Regional
USA Stadium-Millington, TN (Host: Rhodes College)

Central Regional
Jack Horenberger Field-Bloomington, IL (Host: Illinois Wesleyan University)

Midwest Regional
Prucha Field at James B. Miller Stadium-Whitewater, WI (Host: University of Wisconsin-Whitewater)

New York Regional
Leo Pinckney Field at Falcon Park-Auburn, NY (Host: State University of New York at Cortland)

New England Regional
Whitehouse Field-Harwich, MA (Host: Eastern College Athletic Conference)

World Series
Time Warner Cable Field at Fox Cities Stadium-Grand Chute, WI (Host: University of Wisconsin-Oshkosh/Lawrence University/Fox Cities Convention and Visitors Bureau)

References

NCAA Division III Baseball Tournament
2011 college baseball season